Carmen Marina Torres  (8 October 1956 – 6 October 2015) was a Colombian actress from El Charco. She was best known for her participation in various telenovelas such as Zorro, La Espada y la Rosa, La Tormenta and Telemundo's El Clon.

Filmography
 2010 – El Clon ... Estella
 2008 – La Traición ...
 2007 – Zorro, La Espada y la Rosa ... Dolores
 2005 – La Tormenta ... Natividad "Nani" Esparragosa
 2002 – Siete Veces Amada ... Esther
 1995 – Maria Bonita ... Tona

References

External links
 

1956 births
2015 deaths
Place of death missing
Colombian telenovela actresses
Colombian television actresses
People from Nariño Department
Afro-Colombian